Slavik may refer to:

Slavík (feminine Slavíková), a Czech surname meaning "nightingale". Notable people include:

 František Slavík, Czech slalom canoeist
 František Slavík (athlete), Czech athlete
 Martin Slavík, Czech footballer
 Tomáš Slavík, Czech skier

Slávik (feminine Sláviková), a Slovak surname meaning "nightingale". Notable people include:

 Jaroslav Slávik, Slovak luger
 Matej Slávik, Slovak footballer

See also
 
 Český slavík, Czech music awards
 Slovenský slávik, Slovak music awards
 Zlatý slavík, Czechoslovak music awards

Czech-language surnames
Slovak-language surnames